Boryeonsan is a mountain in the city of Chungju, Chungcheongbuk-do in South Korea.

See also
List of mountains in Korea

Notes

References

Mountains of South Korea
Mountains of North Chungcheong Province